Bobby Webb (born 1953) is an American former professional tennis player.

A native of Atlanta, Webb played collegiate tennis for Georgia Tech, before leaving in 1973 to pursue a career on the professional tour. He achieved a ranking inside the world's top 200 and featured in qualifying for Wimbledon.

References

External links
 
 

1953 births
Living people
American male tennis players
Georgia Tech Yellow Jackets men's tennis players
Tennis players from Atlanta